As a nickname, Jug may refer to:

 Gene Ammons (1925–1974), American jazz tenor saxophonist
 Earl Bennett (American football guard) (1920–1992), National Football League player during the 1946 season
 Jug Earp (1897–1969), American National Football League player
 Jug Girard (1927–1997), American National Football League player
 Joe Kracher (1913–1981), Major League Baseball player during the 1939 season
 Carl Powis (1928–1999), Major League Baseball player during the 1957 season
 Jug McSpaden (1908–1996), American golfer
 Jug Thesenga (1914–2002), American baseball pitcher
 Jug or Jugg, a nickname for a fisherman from Brighton, England

See also 

Lists of people by nickname